John William Catley (born 16 March 1945) is an English former professional footballer who played as a winger.

References

1945 births
Living people
Footballers from Grimsby
English footballers
Association football wingers
Grimsby Town F.C. players
English Football League players